The seventh and final season of 30 Rock, an American television comedy series on the NBC network in the United States, began airing on October 4, 2012. 30 Rock was renewed for a seventh and final season of 13 episodes on May 10, 2012, to air on Thursdays at 8:00 pm. The hour-long series finale wrapped filming on December 19, 2012, and aired on January 31, 2013.

Alec Baldwin reportedly approached NBC and offered to cut his pay in order for 30 Rock to be renewed for a full seventh and eighth season. He stated the following (via Twitter) on October 4, 2012: "I offered NBC to cut my pay 20% in order to have a full 7th and 8th seasons of 30 Rock. I realize times have changed". The season received critical acclaim and drew 13 Primetime Emmy Award nominations, the most of any comedy series for the year 2013. It ultimately won two, including one for Tina Fey and Tracey Wigfield's writing for the series finale, "Last Lunch" and another for Outstanding Casting for a Comedy Series.

Synopsis
Season 7 continues to develop the relationship between Liz and Criss (James Marsden), as the pair try for children and consider getting married. Meanwhile, Jack attempts to improve his future prospects at the company, first by trying to "tank" NBC and convince Kabletown CEO Hank Hooper (Ken Howard) to sell it, and later by plotting to discredit his granddaughter and future CEO, Kaylee Hooper (Chloë Grace Moretz). Ultimately, however, he begins to wonder if he is truly happy. Elsewhere, Tracy has found success with his new movie studio, which produces comedy films mostly starring African American actors, in similar fashion to Tyler Perry; Jenna prepares to marry her longterm boyfriend Paul (Will Forte), and Kenneth has started a relationship with Hazel (Kristen Schaal), unaware that she is using him to get her moment on TGS.

Cast
Tina Fey portrays Liz Lemon, the head writer of a fictitious live sketch-comedy television series TGS. The TGS cast consists of two main actors. The lead actor is the loose cannon movie star Tracy Jordan, portrayed by Tracy Morgan. His co-star is the extremely narcissistic Jenna Maroney, portrayed by Jane Krakowski. Jack McBrayer plays the naïve, perpetually cheerful NBC page Kenneth Parcell. Scott Adsit acts as the witty and wise TGS producer, Pete Hornberger. Judah Friedlander portrays trucker hat-wearing staff writer Frank Rossitano. Alec Baldwin plays the NBC network executive Jack Donaghy. Donaghy's full corporate title for the majority of the season is "Head of East Coast Television and Microwave Oven Programming". Keith Powell plays the Harvard University alumnus and TGS staff writer James "Toofer" Spurlock. Katrina Bowden acts as writers' assistant Cerie Xerox. Other cast members include Grizz Chapman as Grizz Griswold, Kevin Brown as "Dot Com" Slattery, and John Lutz as J.D. Lutz. Maulik Pancholy returned to the main cast this season after having left the cast before season six. The cast for the season also featured recurring guest stars Kristen Schaal as  Hazel Wassername, a new NBC page obsessed with making it in show business, and James Marsden as Criss Chros, Liz's boyfriend, and later husband.

Main cast
 Tina Fey as Liz Lemon (13 episodes)
 Tracy Morgan as Tracy Jordan (13 episodes)
 Jane Krakowski as Jenna Maroney (13 episodes)
 Jack McBrayer as Kenneth Parcell (13 episodes)
 Scott Adsit as Pete Hornberger (7 episodes)
 Judah Friedlander as Frank Rossitano (12 episodes)
 Alec Baldwin as Jack Donaghy (13 episodes) 
 Katrina Bowden as Cerie Xerox (7 episodes)
 Keith Powell as James "Toofer" Spurlock (5 episodes)
 Kevin Brown as Walter "Dot Com" Slattery (7 episodes)
 Grizz Chapman as Warren "Grizz" Griswold (6 episodes)
 Maulik Pancholy as Jonathan (4 episodes)
 John Lutz as J.D. Lutz (7 episodes)

Recurring cast
 James Marsden as Criss Chros (4 episodes)
 Sue Galloway as Sue LaRoche-Van der Hout (3 episodes)
 Bethany Hall as Bethany (3 episodes)
 Steve Higgins as Homonym host (3 episodes)
 Kristen Schaal as Hazel Wassername (3 episodes)
 Ken Howard as Hank Hooper (2 episodes)
 Adrienne C. Moore as various characters (2 episodes)
 Megan Mullally as Bev (2 episodes)
 Chris Parnell as Dr. Leo Spaceman (2 episodes)
 Subhas Ramsaywack as Subhas (2 episodes)

Guest stars
 Nina Arianda as Zarina (Episode: "Stride of Pride")
 Will Arnett as Devon Banks (Episode: "Game Over")
 Pat Battle as herself (Episode: "My Whole Life Is Thunder")
 Tony Bennett as himself (Episode: "Mazel Tov, Dummies")
 Richard Belzer as himself (Episode: "Hogcock!")
 Matthew Broderick as Cooter (Episode: "Governor Dunston")
 Steve Buscemi as Len Wazniak/Jan Foster (Episode: "Game Over")
 Don Cheadle as himself (Episode: "Unwindulax")
 Gary Cole as Roger (Episode: "Unwindulax")
 Bryan Cranston as Ron (Episode: "Governor Dunston")
 Jimmy Fallon as himself (Episode: "Governor Dunston")
 Will Forte as Paul L'astnamé (Episode: "My Whole Life is Thunder")
 Judy Gold as herself (Episode: "My Whole Life is Thunder")
 Salma Hayek as Elisa (Episode: "Hogcock!")
 Florence Henderson as herself (Episode: "My Whole Life is Thunder")
 John Hodgman as Terry (Episode: "Mazel Tov, Dummies")
 Marceline Hugot as Kathy Geiss (Episode: "Last Lunch")
 Ice-T as himself (Episode: "Hogcock!")
 Cheyenne Jackson as Danny (Episode: "There's No I in America")
 Kermit the Frog as himself (Episode: "My Whole Life is Thunder")
 Gayle King as herself (Episode: "My Whole Life is Thunder")
 Jessica Leccia as Maria (Episode: "There's No "I" in America")
 Ryan Lochte as himself (Episode: "Stride of Pride")
 Kellan Lutz as himself (Episode: "Unwindulax")
 Rebecca Mader as Super Hot Lady (Episode: "My Whole Life is Thunder")
 Andrea Martin as Bonnie (Episode: "My Whole Life is Thunder")
 Tim Meadows as Martin Lutherking (Episode: "Florida")
 John McEnroe as himself (Episode: "Game Over")
 Chloë Grace Moretz as Kaylie Hooper (Episode: "Game Over")
 Julianne Moore as Nancy (Episode: "Hogcock!")
 Conan O'Brien as himself (Episode: "Last Lunch")
 Catherine O'Hara as Pearline (Episode: "Governor Dunston")
 Paula Pell as Paula, Pete's wife (Episode: "Last Lunch")
 Nancy Pelosi as herself (Episode: "Hogcock!")
 Thomas Roberts as himself (Episode: "Governor Dunston")
 Al Roker as himself (Episode: "Last Lunch")
 Amy Sedaris as Visor Lady (Episode: "Unwindulax")
 Sue Simmons as herself (Episode: "My Whole Life is Thunder")
 Octavia Spencer as herself (Episode: "My Whole Life is Thunder")
 Elaine Stritch as Colleen Donaghy (Episode: "My Whole Life is Thunder")
 Brian Williams as himself (Episode: "There's No "I" in America")
 Wendy Williams as herself (Episode: "My Whole Life is Thunder")
 Dean Winters as Dennis Duffy (Episode: "Mazel Tov, Dummies!")

Episodes

Reception

Critical reception
30 Rocks final season was widely acclaimed. On Rotten Tomatoes, the season has an approval rating of 93% with an average score of 8.6 out of 10 based on 30 reviews. The website's critical consensus reads, "30 Rocks final season is an excellent but bittersweet farewell to one of the most hilarious and incisive pop culture satires of its time." Alan Sepinwall, writing for HitFix, opined that "30 Rock isn't limping to the finish line like so many great sitcoms before it. It's been sprinting through this victory lap season, giving all of its characters happy endings [...] revisiting past gags, and making the series' end much harder to accept than if it had stayed a shadow of itself" and concluded that "30 Rock is one of the best comedies to ever appear on the medium it celebrated and mocked with equal measure, and it's going out with one of the best final seasons any comedy has ever had." Roth Cornet, writing for IGN, gave the season an "amazing" 9 out of 10 and commented that "The very best conclusions to stories take us by surprise, in this case make us laugh, and then settle into something that feels inevitable and right. 30 Rock did that." In conclusion, Cornet remarked that "Nothing is perfect, but I laughed hard, cried some and walked away as happy as I could have been with 30 Rock's inevitable end. What is perhaps more surprising, is that a series whose comedy hinged on being unhinged delivered honest life lessons that were as salty as they were sweet. Though never, never saccharine."

Nathan Rabin, writing for The A.V. Club, commented that "One of the great things about the seventh and [...] final season of 30 Rock is that it genuinely feels like an ending, and a very satisfying one at that. 30 Rock could coast on the goodwill generated by the knockout, surprisingly moving Liz Lemon wedding episode but it seems intent on regaining its former glory as it roars its way to a conclusion." He concluded that "After serving as the harried den mother to the 30 Rock gang all these years, Liz thoroughly deserves a happy ending of her own. The same is true of 30 Rock as a whole and this season feels like a send-off worthy to one of the best, most original comedies of the past twenty years." Daniel Goldberg of Slant Magazine awarded the season a 3.5 out of 4 and remarked "For a comedy whose bag of tricks is so transparent, it's gratifying to see that Fey hasn't written herself into a box."

Ratings
The seventh season premiere, "The Beginning of the End", drew 3.5 million viewers, both a significant decrease from the sixth season premiere, "Dance Like Nobody's Watching" (4.5 million), and a significant increase over the sixth season finale, "What Will Happen to the Gang Next Year?" (2.8 million). The third episode of the season, "Stride of Pride", was the lowest-rated in overall viewers, with 3.0 million tuning in, although it was not a series low, a position which continues to be held by the sixth season episode "Nothing Left to Lose", which was seen by 2.8 million. Several episodes demonstrated season highs, with "Mazel Tov, Dummies!" drawing 3.6 million, and "Game Over" and "A Goon's Deed in a Weary World" drawing slightly below and above 3.8 million, respectively. These three episodes also, in turn, demonstrated the best overall viewership for 30 Rock since March 2012.

The series finale, the hour-long broadcast of "Hogcock!" and "Last Lunch", attracted an audience of 4.9 million, demonstrating another season high in overall viewers and an increase of two million viewers over the sixth season finale. These two episodes were also the highest-rated of the series, in overall viewers, for two years. Overall, with the inclusion of DVR viewership, the season averaged 4.6 million viewers, even with the previous season. However, it ranked ninety-ninth for the year, against all other primetime network programming, a thirty-one place improvement over the sixth season.

Awards and nominations
On July 18, 2013, 30 Rock's seventh season received 9 nominations at the 65th Primetime Emmy Awards and 4 nominations at the 65th Primetime Creative Arts Emmy Awards (13 total, the most of any comedy series), including Outstanding Lead Actress in a Comedy Series for Fey, Outstanding Lead Actor in a Comedy Series for Baldwin, Outstanding Supporting Actress in a Comedy Series for Krakowski, Outstanding Guest Actor in a Comedy Series for Will Forte, Outstanding Guest Actress in a Comedy Series for Elaine Stritch, Directing, two nominations for Writing, and its seventh consecutive nomination for Outstanding Comedy Series, bringing the series' total number of Emmy nominations to 112. The series' casting directors won Outstanding Casting For A Comedy Series while Tina Fey and Tracey Wigfield won for their writing for the series finale, "Last Lunch".

At the 19th Screen Actors Guild Awards both Fey and Baldwin won for their performances in the Female and Male Comedy categories respectively, while the cast received a nomination for Outstanding Performance by an Ensemble in a Comedy Series.

References

External links
 
 

2012 American television seasons
2013 American television seasons